Greek Amateur Cup (Greek: Κύπελλο Ερασιτεχνικών Ομάδων Ελλάδος) is one of the most known competitions for amateur teams in Greece.

Amateur Cup Finals

See also
Amateurs' Super Cup Greece
Football records and statistics in Greece

References

External links
RSSSF

Amateur Cup